The 1975–76 Duke Blue Devils men's basketball team represented Duke University in the 1975-76 NCAA Division I men's basketball season. The head coach was Bill Foster and the team finished the season with an overall record of 13–14 and did not qualify for the NCAA tournament.

Schedule

References 

Duke Blue Devils men's basketball seasons
Duke
1975 in sports in North Carolina
1976 in sports in North Carolina